Lady Rose's Daughter is a novel by Mary Augusta Ward that was the best-selling novel in the United States in 1903. The book was adapted in 1920 by director Hugh Ford, into a film starring Elsie Ferguson as Julie Le Breton and David Powell as Captain Warkworth.

Notes

Further reading
 Beer, George Louis (1903). "'Diana of the Crossways' and 'Lady Rose's Daughter'," The Critic, Vol. 42, pp. 534–35.
 Collister, Peter (1986). "Alpine Retreats and Arnoldian Recoveries: Mrs Humphry Ward's Lady Rose's Daughter," Durham University Journal, Vol. 47, pp. 289–99.
 Dall, Caroline Healey (1903). Of "Lady Rose's Daughter." A Defense and an Analysis. Boston: Thomas Todd.

External links
 Lady Rose's Daughter, at Project Gutenberg
 

1903 British novels
English philosophical novels
Novels by Mary Augusta Ward
British novels adapted into films